Hin Lap railway station is a railway station in Muak Lek Subdistrict, Muak Lek District, Saraburi Province, Thailand.

Although it is just a minor station but Hin Lap is very important in terms of being a station for transporting goods. It is also the location of the CSR SDA4 electro-diesel locomotive depot, operated by TPI Polene (Public) Co.,Ltd. This station is the departure and terminal station for many freight trains on the many main railway lines as well.

History
Hin Lap is a minor railway station located on the bend at km 144 of the northeastern railway line. Hin Lap is a historic railway station, because it was one of the battlefields fought between the government forces and Prince Boworadet's forces in an event known as "Boworadet Rebellion" in October 1933. Colonel Phraya Si Sitthisongkhram one of the rebel leaders was shot dead while retreating at the telegraph pole 143/1th on km 143 of the railway line about  before the Hin Lap station in the dusk on October 23, 1933. A plaque commemorating his death is currently installed here.

Train services
Rapid No. 145/146 Bangkok-Ubon Ratchathani-Bangkok
Ordinary No. 233/234 Bangkok-Surin-Bangkok
Local No. 431/432 Kaeng Khoi Junction-Khon Kaen-Kaeng Khoi Junction

References

Railway stations in Thailand